Vittina gagates is a species of sea snail, a marine gastropod mollusk in the family Neritidae.

Description

Distribution

References

 Récluz, C., 1850. - Notice sur le genre Nerita et sur le S.-G. Neritina, avec le Catalogue synonymique des Neritines. Journal de Conchyliologie 1: 131-164
 Fischer-Piette, E., 1950. - Listes des types décrits dans le Journal de Conchyliologie et conservés dans la collection de ce journal. Journal de Conchyliologie 90: 8-2
 Hiroaki Fukumori. Evolutionary history, species diversity and biogeography of amphidromous neritid gastropods in the Indo-West Pacific
 Eichhorst T.E. (2016). Neritidae of the world. Volume 2. Harxheim: Conchbooks. Pp. 696-1366.

External links
 Lamarck, [J.-B. M. de. (1822). Histoire naturelle des animaux sans vertèbres. Tome sixième, 2me partie. Paris: published by the Author, 232 pp.]
 Deshayes, G. P. (1863). Catalogue des mollusques de l'île de la Réunion (Bourbon). Pp. 1-144. In Maillard, L. (Ed.) Notes sur l'Ile de la Réunion. Dentu, Paris
 Martens, E. von. (1863-1879). Die Gattung Neritina. In: Küster, H. C.; Kobelt, W., Weinkauff, H. C., Eds. Systematisches Conchylien-Cabinet von Martini und Chemnitz. Neu herausgegeben und vervollständigt. Zweiten Bandes zehnte Abtheilung. 1-303, pls A, 1-23. Nürnberg: Bauer & Raspe.

Neritidae